Gorgie-Dalry is the name given to the joint community council, consisting of Gorgie and Dalry in the west of Edinburgh, the Scottish capital. The area also incorporates Tynecastle and parts of Ardmillan.

Street signposts often use the Gorgie-Dalry logo, which is a G and a D in orange, running into one another; this logo was designed as part of a local competition and part of community based initiatives to instill pride in the local area.

Several local free newspapers and newssheets used to be distributed in this area; however these ceased distribution due to council expenditure cutbacks in 2008.

Areas of Edinburgh